The August 20, 1961, race at Indianapolis Raceway Park was the tenth racing event of the eleventh season of the Sports Car Club of America's 1961 Championship Racing Series.

B Production Results

References

External links
Etceterini.com
RacingSportsCars.com
Dick Lang Racing History

Indianapolis Raceway Park Grand Prix
1961 in sports in Indiana
Motorsport in Indiana